In mathematics, the extended natural numbers is a set which contains the values  and  (infinity). That is, it is the result of adding a maximum element  to the natural numbers.

With addition and multiplication,  is a semiring but not a ring, as  lacks an additive inverse.

Applications
In graph theory, the extended natural numbers are used to define distances in graphs, with  being the distance between two unconnected vertices. They can be used to show the extension of some results, such as the max-flow min-cut theorem, to infinite graphs.

In topology, the topos of right actions on the extended natural numbers is a category PRO of projection algebras.

In constructive mathematics, the extended natural numbers  are a one-point compactification of the natural numbers, yielding the set of non-increasing binary sequences i.e.  such that . The sequence  represents , while the sequence  represents .

Notes

References

Further reading

External links
 

Number theory